Line 3, currently known as Zona Universitària – Trinitat Nova, coloured green and often simply referred to as Línia verda ("Green line"), is a metro line in Barcelona operated by TMB, and therefore part of the fare-integrated ATM transport network of the urban region. This V-shaped line is the result of the junction of two related lines: the original L3 and L3B, in 1982. The central section of L3 has the city's oldest metro stations, built in the mid-1920s, with additions almost every decade since then. All of L3 stations are underground.

Its termini as of 2021 are Zona Universitària, which serves the University of Barcelona campus located in the western end Avinguda Diagonal in the Les Corts district, and Trinitat Nova in Nou Barris. There are plans for it to be extended from Trinitat Nova to Trinitat Vella, for connection with Line 1, and also from Zona Universitària to nearby suburbs in the comarca of Baix Llobregat.

Overview
Line L3 is the oldest line in the metro network, having opened in 1924 under the name Gran Metro de Barcelona with the occasion of the 1927 World Fair, joining Plaça Lesseps with Plaça Catalunya, the latter becoming the central underground station in the city and a terminus of both metro lines. It was operated by now defunct Compañía del Gran Metro de Barcelona (GMB). Nowadays it covers a V-shaped area between the west end of Avinguda Diagonal (Zona Universitària) and Canyelles as a result of the integration of the original L3 and a subsidiary line called L3B or L3bis which appeared in 1975 joining Drassanes with Zona Universitària, and which became part of a larger L3 in 1982 when the infrastructures of both joined and they became fare-integrated. A section of the original L3 disappeared as plans to extend it in that direction would have required too much effort and the construction of L4 provided coverage for the line. These former stations of L3 remain unused.

Chronology

1924 – Catalunya-Lesseps section opened.
1925 – Fontana station opened. Catalunya-Liceu section opened.
1926 – Passeig de Gràcia-Jaume I section opened.
1934 – Jaume I-Correos section opened.
1946 – Liceu-Fernando section opened.
1968 – Fernando-Drassanes section opened.
1970 – Drassanes-Paral·lel section opened.
1972 – Passeig de Gràcia-Correos section closed.
1975 – Paral·lel-Zona Universitària section opened (as L3B).
1982 – L3B integrated into L3.
1985 – Lesseps-Montbau section opened.
2001 – Montbau-Canyelles section opened.
2008 – Canyelles-Trinitat Nova section opened.

Current stations

Former stations

Fernando
Banco (nowadays would be on L4)
Correos (nowadays would be on L4)

References

External links 
 

3
Transport in Ciutat Vella
Transport in Gràcia
Transport in Eixample
Transport in Horta-Guinardó
Transport in Les Corts (district)
Transport in Nou Barris
Transport in Sants-Montjuïc
Railway lines opened in 1924
Standard gauge railways in Spain